The Skydra railway station is the railway station of Skydra in Central Macedonia, Greece. The station is located near the center of the settlement, on the Thessaloniki–Bitola railway, and is severed by both Local and Proastiakos Services.

History

Opened in June 1894 as Vertekop railway station in what was then the Ottoman Empire at the completion of the Société du Chemin de Fer ottoman Salonique-Monastir, a branchline of the Chemins de fer Orientaux from Thessaloniki to Bitola. During this period, Northern Greece and the southern Balkans where still under Ottoman rule, and Skydras was known as Vertekop. Skydra was annexed by Greece on 18 October 1912 during the First Balkan War. The station building was built in 1916 following a decision of the French headquarters in Thessaloniki, with Serbian soldiers worked on the construction of the building. In May 1918, the station was bombed by the German air force. On 17 October 1925 The Greek government purchased the Greek sections of the former Salonica Monastir railway, and the railway became part of the Hellenic State Railways, with the remaining section north of Florina seeded to Yugoslavia. In 1926 the station, along with the settlement, was renamed Skydra. In 1970, OSE became the legal successor to the SEK, taking over responsibilities for most of Greece's rail infrastructure. On 1 January 1971, the station and most of Greek rail infrastructure where transferred to the Hellenic Railways Organisation S.A., a state-owned corporation. Freight traffic declined sharply when the state-imposed monopoly of OSE for the transport of agricultural products and fertilisers ended in the early 1990s. Many small stations of the network with little passenger traffic were closed down.

In 2001 the infrastructure element of OSE was created, known as GAIAOSE, it would henceforth be responsible for the maintenance, of stations, bridges and other elements of the network, as well as the leasing and the sale of railway assists. In 2003, OSE launched "Proastiakos SA", as a subsidiary to serve the operation of the suburban network in the urban complex of Athens during the 2004 Olympic Games. In 2005, TrainOSE was created as a brand within OSE to concentrate on rail services and passenger interface.

Since 2007, the station is served by the Proastiakos Thessaloniki services to New Railway Station. In 2008, all Proastiakos were transferred from OSE to TrainOSE. In 2009, with the Greek debt crisis unfolding OSE's Management was forced to reduce services across the network. Timetables were cutback, and routes closed as the government-run entity attempted to reduce overheads. In 2017 OSE's passenger transport sector was privatised as TrainOSE, currently a wholly-owned subsidiary of Ferrovie dello Stato Italiane infrastructure, including stations, remained under the control of OSE. In July 2022, the station began being served by Hellenic Train, the rebranded TranOSE

Facilities
The station is still housed in the original brick-built station building; however, as of (2020) it is closed and rundown. There is no ticket office or waiting rooms. There is a footbridge over the lines, though passengers can walk across the rails, it is however not wheelchair accessible.

Services
As of 2020, the station is served on a daily basis by three InterCity trains between Thessaloniki and Florina and 18 Prostiakos terminating at Edessa. There are no Services to Bitola as the short international connection is now disused, with all international traffic being routed via Idomeni and Gevgelija.

Station Layout

External links
 Skydra railway station - National Railway Network Greek Travel Pages

References

Railway stations in Central Macedonia
Railway stations opened in 1894
Buildings and structures in Pella (regional unit)